The following squads were named for the 1927 South American Championship that took place in Peru.

Argentina
 Ángel Bossio
 Octavio Díaz
 Ludovico Bidoglio
 Juan Evaristo
 Humberto Recanatini
 Adolfo Zumelzú
 José Fossa
 Luis Monti
 Alfredo Carricaberry
 Manuel Ferreira
 Segundo Luna
 Josè Maglio
 Pedro Ochoa
 Mumo Orsi
 Manuel Seoane

Bolivia
 Mario Alborta
 Jesús Bermúdez
 José Bustamante
 Casiano José Chavarría
 Diógenes Lara
 N. Malpartida
 Rafael Méndez
 Froilán Pinilla
 Armando Renjel
 Renato Sáinz
 Carlos Soto
 Jorge Soto
 José Toro
 Jorge Luis Valderrama

Peru
 Segundo Aranda
 Leopoldo Basurto
 Esteban Dagnino
 Filomene García
 Jorge Koochoi Sarmiento
 José María Lavalle
 Antonio Maquilón
 Alberto Montellanos
 Carlos Moscoso
 Adolfo Muro
 Demetrio Neyra
 Jorge Pardon
 Alfonso Saldarriaga
 Eugenio Segala
 Santiago Ulloa
 Alejandro Villanueva

Uruguay
 Miguel Cappuccini
 Andrés Mazali
 Venancio Bartibás
 Ramón Bucetta
 Adhemar Canavessi
 Domingo Tejera
 José Andrade
 Lorenzo Fernandez
 José Vanzzino
 Juan Anselmo
 Juan Pedro Arremón
 Hector Castro
 Santiago Celsi
 Roberto Figueroa
 Pedro Petrone
 Antonio Sacco
 Héctor Scarone

References

Squads
Copa América squads